Meadow is an unincorporated community in Sarpy County, Nebraska, United States.

History
Meadow was established on the railroad on the site of what was a meadow, hence the name. A post office in Meadow operated from 1894 until 1953.

References

Unincorporated communities in Sarpy County, Nebraska
Unincorporated communities in Nebraska